Holozoidae is a family of sea squirts in the order Enterogona.

Genera
Distaplia
Hypodistoma
Hypsistozoa 
Neodistoma
Polydistoma
Protoholozoa
Pseudoplacentela
Sigillina
Sycozoa

References 

Aplousobranchia
Tunicate families